Balls is a 2010 Swedish comedy film directed by Josef Fares and starring Jan Fares, Torkel Petersson, Hamadi Khemiri, Nina Zanjani, Juan Rodriguez, Anita Wall, and Jessica Forsberg.

Cast
 Jan Fares as Aziz (farsan)
 Torkel Petersson as Jörgen
 Hamadi Khemiri as Sami
 Nina Zanjani as Amanda
 Juan Rodriguez as Juan
 Anita Wall as Edith
 Jessica Forsberg as Lotta

Reception
In Sweden, the film got mixed reviews. In Aftonbladet the film was given a 3 out of 5 rating and was described as "not the best or funniest of Josef Fares's movies - but it is a warm and loving comical hommage to quirky fathers in general". In Expressen, the review was slightly less favorable (2 out of 5) and Fares was described as playing with safe cards in his somewhat artificial characters. In other big newspapers the reviews were similar: 3 out of 5 in Dagens Nyheter and 2 out of 6 in Svenska Dagbladet.

References

External links
 
 

2010 films
2010s Swedish-language films
Swedish comedy films
2010 comedy films
Films directed by Josef Fares
2010s Swedish films